Prochorus (Latin form of the , Prochoros) was one of the Seven Deacons chosen to care for the poor of the Christian community in Jerusalem (Acts ). According to later tradition, he was also one of the Seventy Disciples sent out by Jesus in Luke 10.

Tradition calls Prochorus the nephew of Stephen the Protomartyr. St Prochorus accompanied the holy Apostle Peter, who ordained him to be the bishop in the city of Nicomedia. He is also thought to have been a companion of John the Apostle, who consecrated him bishop of Nicomedia in Bithynia. Some modern scholars dispute him to have been the author of the apocryphal Acts of John, which is dated by them to the end of the 2nd century. According to the late tradition, he was the bishop of Antioch and ended his life as a martyr in Antioch in the 1st century.

In Orthodox iconography, he is depicted as a scribe of St John the Evangelist. He is one of 4 out of the 7 deacons of the 70 Apostles to be jointly celebrated on July 28.

Gallery

References

External links 

 Prochorus – Ökumenisches Heiligenlexikon
 

Seventy disciples
Saints from Roman Anatolia
Christian saints from the New Testament
People in Acts of the Apostles